Sir Henry Barkly  (24 February 1815 – 20 October 1898) was a British politician, colonial governor and patron of the sciences.

Early life and education
Born on 24 February 1815 at Highbury, Middlesex (now London), he was the eldest son of Susannah Louisa (born ffrith) and Æneas Barkly, a Scottish born West India merchant. He was educated at Bruce Castle School in Tottenham, where the school's particular curriculum endowed him with a lifetime interest in science and statistics.

Upon completing his schooling and studies in commerce, Barkly worked for his father. The Barkly family had several connections with the West Indies: Barkly's mother, Susannah Louisa, whose maiden name was ffrith, was the daughter of a Jamaica planter; his father's company was concerned with trade in the West Indies; and the family owned an estate in British Guiana.

According to the Legacies of British Slave-ownership database Barkly's father was compensated £132,000 from the Imperial Parliament for the emancipation of some 4,440 slaves in 1834. Barkly inherited his father's estate in 1836 at the age of 20. He was awarded two of the compensation claims following his father's death. He remained involved in the partnership until 1843.

Political career
Barkly was elected to the House of Commons at a by-election on 26 April 1845 as one of the two Members of Parliament (MPs) for the borough Leominster.
He was returned unopposed, and The Times observed that his election address did not render voters "much wiser" about his political views.

As a Peelite, one of the supporters of Prime Minister Robert Peel, Barkly found himself adrift with few political prospects when Peel was overthrown, and he gratefully accepted the governorship of British Guiana when the post was offered by his Liberal opponents in 1848.

Governorships

Governor of British Guiana
Barkly was sworn in as Governor and Commander-in-Chief of British Guiana on 12 February 1849. His family connections with British Guiana and the West Indies in general served him well as governor of the colony, and prompted Lord Grey, the Secretary of State for War and the Colonies, to refer to his "remarkable skill and ability" in addressing the colony's economic issues by widening the franchise of the College of Kiezers and introducing indentured servants from Asia.

Governor of Jamaica
In 1853, he was transferred to Jamaica and served three years as its governor and captain-general.

Governor of Victoria
In November 1856, Barkly was appointed Governor of Victoria, Australia, arriving in Melbourne on 24 December 1856. He achieved one of his main goals of stable government with the appointment of the James McCulloch ministry. He was noted for his support of philanthropic and intellectual movements. He was a founder and president of the Royal Society of Victoria, 1860–63, and helped to found the National Gallery of Victoria, the Acclimatization Society and the National Observatory.

Governor of Mauritius and the Cape Colony
He was appointed 10th Governor of Mauritius from 26 November 1863 to 4 June 1870.

In August 1870 he was sent to the Cape of Good Hope as Governor of Cape Colony and as British High Commissioner for Southern Africa. He helped to implement responsible government in the Cape and worked closely with John Molteno, its first elected Prime Minister. He served in South Africa until 1877, and played an important role in assisting the early growth of the Cape Liberal tradition. He was also influential in supporting the local resistance against Lord Carnarvon's attempt to unite the region's states into a federation (inspired by the success of the Canadian Confederation). Crucially, he shared with the Cape government the belief that the Cape's non-racial constitution was still fragile and that it was "impossible that the Cape's native laws would survive a session of bargaining with the Boer republics. Federation in 1875 would have produced the same results as Union did in 1910... Barkly was undoubtedly right to foster the nucleus of a Liberal party which was forming around Molteno. Liberal democracy was a tender plant in the climate of South Africa, but it had taken root in the Cape, and it was only the insensitive handling of Downing Street which prevented it growing, as Barkly hoped, into a force which would have been strong enough to control the other tendencies in South African politics."

He was involved with the Royal Commission on Colonial Defence in 1879.

He died in Brompton, Kensington, London on 20 October 1898 and is buried in Brompton Cemetery.

Family
In 1840, he married Elizabeth Helen, the second daughter of J. F. Timins. Elizabeth was an artist and botanical collector who collected with her husband and undertook illustrations for him. She died in 1857 leaving him with their daughter Emily. Emily was also a botanical artist, drawing illustrations for her father and collecting botanical specimens. Barkly was remarried to the botanist Anne Maria Pratt, the daughter of Thomas Simson Pratt, three years after the death of his first wife.  His oldest son Arthur Cecil Stuart Barkly (1843–1890) was his father's private secretary in Mauritius and the Cape, and went on to become the last British governor of Heligoland.

Honours
Henry Barkly was awarded a Knight of the Order of the Bath on 18 July 1853, just prior to his appointment as Governor of Jamaica. He was made a Fellow of the Royal Society (FRS) in 1864, and of the Royal Geographical Society (FRGS) in 1870. He was made a GCMG on 9 March 1874.

Legacy 
The Navarre diggings, a small Victorian gold field was named Barkly on 1 November 1861 in his honour.

The South African towns of Barkly East and Barkly West, and the Barkly Pass are named after him.

Several notable streets were named after him including a main civic street in Ballarat East named Barkly Street for him in 1858 along with the main street of Ararat, Victoria also named Barkly Street.  Barkly Street in Mentone, Victoria was named for him though later renamed Rogers Street. The Barkly River, located in the alpine region of Victoria, within the Alpine National Park, is named in honour of Barkly. The bell atop the tower of the Ballarat Fire Brigade, on the corner of Barkly & East streets, Ballarat East was christened the "Lady Barkly" by the brigades Captain in August 1863.

Publications
 MacMillan, Mona (1969). "Sir Henry Barkly, mediator and moderator, 1815-1898". Balkema: Cape Town. 
 Barkly, Sir Henry,KCB,GCMG, The Earlier House of Berkeley, published in Transactions of the Bristol and Gloucestershire Archaeological Society,  Vol. 8, 1883-84, pp. 193–223

References

External links 

 
 
 

1815 births
1898 deaths
Burials at Brompton Cemetery
Fellows of the Royal Society
Fellows of the Royal Geographical Society
West Indies merchants
Governors of British Guiana
Governors of the Cape Colony
Governors of Jamaica
Governors of Victoria (Australia)
Members of the Parliament of the United Kingdom for English constituencies
Knights Commander of the Order of the Bath
Knights Grand Cross of the Order of St Michael and St George
People educated at Bruce Castle School
UK MPs 1841–1847
UK MPs 1847–1852
19th-century British people
Colony of Victoria people
Governors of Mauritius
19th-century British businesspeople